Powerlong Art Museum is a 23,000 square meter art museum in Qibao, a township in the Minhang District of Shanghai, opened in November 2017 by Powerlong and its founder Xu Jiankang.

References

External links 
 Powerlong Museum (Official website)

2017 establishments in China
Museums established in 2017
Art museums and galleries in China
Museums in Shanghai